Dieter Zorc (born 17 October 1939 – 16 October 2007) was a German football defender. He was the father of Michael Zorc.

Career

Statistics

References

External links
 

1939 births
2007 deaths
German footballers
Bundesliga players
VfL Bochum players
Association football defenders
People from Lünen
Sportspeople from Arnsberg (region)
Footballers from North Rhine-Westphalia